Isar District is in Marvast County, Yazd province, Iran. At the 2006 National Census, the region's population (as Isar Rural District of Marvast District in Khatam County) was 2,502 in 622 households. The following census in 2011 counted 2,621 people in 682 households. At the latest census in 2016, there were 2,524 inhabitants in 721 households. After the census, the district was raised to the status of a county and split into two districts: the Central District and Isar District.

References 

Districts of Yazd Province

Populated places in Yazd Province

fa:بخش ایثار